Adam's World of Imagination is an Indian film production and distribution company established by Asif Ali and Sajin Jaffar.

The company's first project was Kohinoor, directed by Vinay Govind, of Kili Poyi fame. This 2015 film features Asif Ali, Indrajith Sukumaran, Aparna Vinod and Aju Varghese in the lead roles.

Films

References

External links
 Official YouTube channel

Film production companies of Kerala
Film distributors of India
Indian companies established in 2015
2015 establishments in Kerala
Mass media companies established in 2015